Sivaraman Cheriyanad was a Malayalam-language writer from Kerala, India. He wrote short stories, novels and children's literature, besides contributing to scholarly literature including studies on the works of Parappurath and Malayattoor Ramakrishnan. He received the Abu Dhabi Sakthi Award and A. P. Kalakkad Award. He was also a school teacher and a recipient of the National Teachers Award.

Life
Sivaraman was born on 13 December 1941 in Cheriyanad near Chengannur in the present-day Alleppey district of Kerala. He started his career as an upper primary school teacher. He was a teacher in Tamil Nadu, Malabar and Alleppey, and retired from Government Girls Higher Secondary School, Mavelikkara. He received the National Teachers Award in 1989. The same year, he received the Abu Dhabi Sakthi Award for the year 1988 for his short story collection Peruchazhikalude Maalam. He received a scholarship from the Kerala Sahitya Akademi in 1990-91 for the study of the works of the writer Parappurath. He received the A. P. Kalakkad Award in 2009. He was the president of Sahithya Pravarthaka Co-operative Society for nine years. He also served as the vice president of A. R. Raja Raja Varma Memorial Committee, office-bearer of Purogamana Kala Sahitya Sangham, and an executive member of the publication wing of Kerala Sahitya Akademi. He died on 12 September 2019 at a private hospital in Kollakadavu near Cheriyanad. His wife Sarasamma had predeceased him.

Works

Short story collections

Novels

Children's literature

Scholarly literature

Awards
 1988: Abu Dhabi Sakthi Award – Peruchazhikalude Maalam
 1989: National Teachers Award
 2009: A. P. Kalakkad Award

References

1941 births
2019 deaths
Malayali people
Malayalam-language writers
Malayalam short story writers
Malayalam novelists
Indian children's writers
Writers from Alappuzha
Recipients of the Abu Dhabi Sakthi Award